Nicholas Kozdra is an Australian–Polish professional association football player who plays as a defender.

Career
In 2015, he played for Australian club Green Gully.

On 15 July 2016, Kozdra was reported to the games as a player of Polish II liga club Stal Stalowa Wola. Just one day later, he made his debut appearance in a 4–0 Polish Cup's defeat against Radomiak Radom. His contract was terminated after the 2016–17 season.

References

External links

Living people
1996 births
Australian soccer players
Australian expatriate soccer players
Australian people of Polish descent
Association football midfielders
Green Gully SC players
Stal Stalowa Wola players
II liga players
Soccer players from Melbourne
Australian expatriate sportspeople in Poland
Expatriate footballers in Poland